RCCC may refer to:

Rowan–Cabarrus Community College, an American college in North Carolina 
Royal Caledonian Curling Club, a curling club in Scotland
Red/Clear Sensors, a Color filter array